Romance of the Three Kingdoms VII (三國志VII) is the 7th installment in Koei's famous Romance of the Three Kingdoms series.

Power up kit
Power up kit includes following features:

Short play mode.
New tactical simulation mode. This mode consists of battles and event surrounding the 3 kingdoms of Wei, Wu, Shu.
Added events.
Logs for players activities.
Data editor.

Power up kit features are incorporated into PlayStation 2 version of the game.

Reception
On release, Famitsu magazine scored the PlayStation version of the game a 30 out of 40, and the later PlayStation 2 version scored a 32 out of 40.

References

External links

2000 video games
Classic Mac OS games
PlayStation 2 games
PlayStation (console) games
PlayStation Portable games
Windows games
7
Turn-based strategy video games
Grand strategy video games
Video games developed in Japan
Video games scored by Tomoki Hasegawa